The 2005 Australian GT Championship was an Australian motor racing competition for "closed production based sports cars". It was sanctioned by the Confederation of Australian Motor Sport (CAMS) as a "National Championship".

It was the ninth Australian GT Championship and the first to be held since 1985. CAMS revived the GT Championship after the demise of the Australian Nations Cup Championship at the end of 2004.

The championship was won by Bryce Washington driving a Porsche 911 GT3 Cup.

Entries

Schedule
The title was contested over a five-round series with three races per round.

Points system
Championship points were awarded on a 38-32-28-25-23-21-19-18-17-16-15-14-13-12-11-10-9-8-7-6-5-4-3-2-1 basis to the first 25 classified finishers in each race. An additional 3 points were awarded to the fastest qualifier at each round.

Results

Australian Porsche Drivers Challenge
The Australian Porsche Drivers Challenge, which was run concurrently with the Australian GT Championship, was won by Bryce Washington.

References

External links
 CAMS Bulletin B05/065 - 2005 Australian GT Championship Sporting & Technical Regulations, Re-issue, 13 July 2005, cams.com.au, as archived at web.archive.org 
 porschedriverschallenge.com.au, as archived at web.archive.org on 2 April 2006

Australian GT Championship
Gt Championship Season, 2005